is a town located in Iwate Prefecture, Japan. , the town had an estimated population of 13,111, and a population density of 36 persons per km² in 5455 households.

Geography
Iwate is located in an inland region in northwest Iwate Prefecture.

Neighboring municipalities
Iwate Prefecture
Morioka
Hachimantai
Ichinohe
Kuzumaki

Climate
Iwate Town has a humid continental climate (Köppen climate classification Dfa) characterized by mild summers and cold winters. The average annual temperature in Iwate is 8.4 °C. The average annual rainfall is 1384 mm with September as the wettest month, and February as the driest month. The temperatures are highest on average in August, at around 22.0 °C, and lowest in January, at around -4.1 °C.

Demographics
Per Japanese census data, the population of Iwate has steadily declined over the past 60 years.

History
The area of present-day Iwate was part of ancient Mutsu Province. It was under the control of the Nambu clan during the Edo period, who ruled Morioka Domain under the Tokugawa shogunate.

Numakunai, Kawaguchi, Ikkatai and Midō villages were created within Kita-Iwate District on April 1, 1889, with the establishment of the modern municipality system. Kita-Iwate and Minami-Iwate Districts merged to form Iwate District on March 29, 1896. The four villages merged to form Iwate Town on July 21, 1955.

Government
Iwate has a mayor-council form of government with a directly elected mayor and a unicameral town council of 14 members. Iwate, together with the city of Hachimantai and the town of Kuzumaki, contributes two seats to the Iwate Prefectural legislature. In terms of national politics, the town is part of Iwate 2nd district of the lower house of the Diet of Japan.

Economy
The local economy is based on agriculture. Iwate is famous for its blueberry production.

Education
Iwate has five public elementary schools and three public middle schools operated by the town government, and one public high school operated by the Iwate Prefectural Board of Education.

Transportation

Railway
 East Japan Railway Company (JR East) - Tōhoku Shinkansen

 Iwate Ginga Railway Line
  -  -

Highway
  – Ishigami-no-oka roadside station

Local attractions
 Ishigami-no-Oka Art Museum

Notable people from Iwate
Seishirō Itagaki, Imperial Japanese Army general

References

External links
 
 Official Website 

 
Towns in Iwate Prefecture